Satish Menon (born 3 October 1969 in Thrissur, Kerala) is an Indian first class cricketer. He is a right-handed batsman representing Kerala in Ranji Trophy. He played a total of fourteen First class and nine List A matches for Kerala. He is currently the CEO of Punjab Kings.

External links
Satish Menon in Cricinfo
Satish Menon in Cricket Online
CricketArchive

Indian cricketers
Kerala cricketers
Living people
1969 births
Cricketers from Thrissur